Gaspar Enriquez (born 1942) is an American artist known for creating portraits of people of Chicano heritage.

Early life 
Enriquez was born in 1942 in the El Segundo Barrio neighborhood of El Paso, Texas. He attended the University of Texas at El Paso, graduating with a bachelor's degree in arts education. He then went on to attend New Mexico State University, where he studied metalwork and graduated with a master's degree.

Career 
Enriquez work was inspired by the students at Bowie High School in El Paso, Texas, where he was a teacher. His influences included Mel Casas and Luis Jimenez, both artist from El Paso. His pieces are usually made with acrylic paint on a paper, canvas and board surface.

A 2016 portrait of Rudolfo Anaya created by Enriquez is held in the collections of the National Portrait Gallery in Washington, D.C.

Examples of Enriquez's work can be found in Cheech Marin's collection of Chicano art housed at The Cheech Marin Center for Chicano Art, Culture & Industry.

Personal life 
Enriquez lives in San Elizario, Texas.

References

Artists from El Paso, Texas
1942 births
University of Texas at El Paso alumni
Living people
New Mexico State University alumni

Website 
http://gasparenriquez.com/about.html